İpek Filiz Yazıcı (born 19 April 2001) is a Turkish actress.

Life and career 
Her family is from Of, Trabzon. She had her television debut in 2016 with the series Babam ve Ailesi. In 2017, she was cast in Fox TV series Kayıtdışı alongside Songül Öden, Erkan Petekkaya and Dolunay Soysert and played the character of "Tuğba Ateş". She continued her television career by a role in the TV series Elimi Bırakma, in which she had the role of "Ceyda".

She had her first leading role with the Netflix original series Aşk 101 and portrayed the character of "Işık". She was also set to have a role in the upcoming TV series Yeni Hayat, but the shooting was postponed following the measures taken due to the COVID-19 pandemic in Turkey.

Aside from her acting career, Yazıcı has appeared in commercials for LC Waikiki and Çokokrem.

Personal life
In September 2020, Yazıcı tested positive for coronavirus, along with her castmates Alina Boz and Kubilay Aka, who also tested positive for the virus. In April 2021, she confirmed that she was in a relationship with singer Ufuk Beydemir. They married on 22 October 2022.

Filmography

Television

Web series

Films

References

External links 
 
 
 

Living people
2001 births
Actresses from Istanbul
Turkish television actresses
21st-century Turkish actresses